The Mahalaxmi Temple is one of the most famous temples of the city of Mumbai, India. It is dedicated to Mahalakshmi the central deity of Devi Mahatmyam. The temple was built in 1831 by Dhakji Dadaji (1760–1846), a Hindu merchant.

History
Built around 1785, the history of this temple is supposedly connected with the building of the Hornby Vellard.  Apparently after portions of the sea wall of the Vellard collapsed twice, the chief engineer, a Pathare Prabhu, named Ramji Shivji Prabhu, dreamt of a devi statue in the sea near Worli.  A search recovered it, and he built a temple for it.  After this, the work on the vellard could be completed without a hitch.

Inside
The Mahalaxmi temple contains images of the Tridevi goddesses Mahakali, Mahalakshmi, and Mahasaraswati. All three images are adorned with nose rings, gold bangles and pearl necklaces. The image of Mahalakshmi is in the center shown holding lotus flowers in tandem. The compound of this temple contains several stalls that sell flower garlands and other paraphernalia used by devotees for worship and as offering.

Navratri Festival
During Navaratri celebrations, devotees from distant places throng to the temple, which is decorated for this occasion, to pay obeisance. They have to stand for hours in long queues holding coconuts, flowers and sweets which they offer to the goddess.

How to reach
It is only 1 km from Mahalakshmi railway station in Mumbai. There are two more temples viz. Tryambakeshwar temple and Mahadev dhakleshwar temple near to the temple.

See also
 History of Mumbai

References

External links

 Official website

Religious buildings and structures completed in 1831
19th-century Hindu temples
Hindu temples in Mumbai
1831 establishments in India